Gilbert (or Giselbert) de Brionne, Count of Eu and of Brionne ( – ), was an influential nobleman in the Duchy of Normandy in Northern France. He was one of the early guardians of Duke William II in his minority, and a first cousin to William's father Duke Robert. Had Lord Brionne not been murdered, the senior house of de Clare would probably have been titled de Brionne. Lord Brionne was the first to be known by the cognomen Crispin because of his hair style which stood up like the branches of a pine tree.

Life
Gilbert de Brionne was son of Geoffrey, Count of Eu (otherwise cited as 'Godfrey'), who was an illegitimate child of Richard I of Normandy. He inherited Brionne, becoming one of the most powerful landowners in Normandy. Gilbert was a generous benefactor to Bec Abbey founded by his former knight Herluin in 1031. When Robert I died in 1035, his illegitimate son William inherited his father's title and several powerful nobles, including Gilbert of Brionne, Osbern the Seneschal and Alan of Brittany, became William's guardians.

Death

A number of Norman barons, including Ralph de Gacé, refused to accept William as their leader. In 1040 an attempt was made to kill William but the plot failed. Gilbert however was murdered while he was peaceably riding near Eschafour. It is believed two of his killers were Ralph of Wacy and Robert de Vitot. This appears to have been an act of vengeance for the wrongs inflicted upon the orphan children of Giroie by Gilbert, and it is not clear what Ralph de Gacé had to do in the business. 

Fearing they might meet their father's fate, Gilbert's sons Richard and Baldwin were conveyed by their friends to the court of Baldwin V, Count of Flanders. Gilbert's children would accompany Duke William on his conquest of England and his descendants would become one of the most powerful noble families in the British isles. They would rule over vast lands in modern-day Ireland, Scotland, and England and become powerful Marcher Lords.

Children
Gilbert de Brionne married Herleve de Falaise and with her had the following children:
Sir Richard fitz Gilbert (Richard de Clare) (bef. 1035 – ), m. Rohese Giffard (1034 – aft. 1113), daughter of Walter Giffard, Lord of Longueville
Baldwin FitzGilbert (d. 1090)
 William (died after 29 August 1060)
 Adela (died August 1092), m. Neel II, Viscount of Cotentin (fr)
 Emma, m. Hugh de Waft
 Hesilia, m. William Malet, Honour of Eye

Through his eldest son, Gilbert was ancestor of the English house of de Clare, of the Barons FitzWalter, and the Earls of Gloucester and Hertford. After Gilbert's death, his uncle William I became Count of Eu whereas Brionne reverted to duke.

Notes

References

1000s births
1040 deaths
Year of birth uncertain
Year of death uncertain
11th-century Normans
Counts of Eu
House of Normandy